Chōgosonshi-ji (朝護孫子寺, popularly called Shigisan (信貴山) is a Buddhist temple in Ikoma, Nara Prefecture, Japan. It was established in 587.

Gallery

See also 
Historical Sites of Prince Shōtoku
List of National Treasures of Japan (paintings)

External links 
Official website

Buddhist temples in Nara Prefecture
Prince Shōtoku